All Aboard is an Irish documentary series, produced by Fubar Films and screened on RTÉjr. The series premiered on Monday 26 March 2018. 
It follows two sisters and their parents on a barge journey down the Grand Canal from Dublin to Shannon Harbour in Co. Offaly. The series is produced by Fiona Bergin and filmed and directed by Fintan Connolly.

Plot 
This 15 part family adventure is set on the beautiful barge ‘Tig Beatha’ as it drifts along the Grand Canal. Sisters Muireann (9) and Caoimhe (7) are the hosts along with their parents Mick and Trish. The family live in a floating home and make many stops on the way. Their journey takes them three weeks.

As well as having fun onboard the family visit special places and try out new activities: going through a lock, feeding swans, stencilling the name on the barge, visiting a fen, helping to clean up the canal, going out in a dinghy, looking for bats at night, getting pulled along by dray horses, meeting a lock keeper, cutting turf on the bog, aqua cycling, pony riding, going on a nature walk, catching butterflies and going fishing.

Episodes

Music 
The score for All Aboard is written by Stephen Rennicks.

References

External links 
 

2018 Irish television series debuts
2018 Irish television series endings
2010s in Irish television
Irish television shows
Television shows set in the Republic of Ireland
RTÉ original programming